Wikstroemia paxiana is a shrub in the family Thymelaeaceae.  It is native to China, specifically Sichuan.

Description
The shrub grows up to 0.3 to 0.5 m tall. Its branches are slender and glabrescent.  Its drupes are reddish, and around 6 mm wide.

References

paxiana